Coridius is a genus of dinidorid bugs. They suck sap mainly from plants belonging to the family Cucurbitaceae. About forty species are known with a native distribution mainly in Africa and Asia. Several species are eaten in parts of South and Southeast Asia. Some species have extended into Europe and are considered as pests on cucurbit crops.

 Coridius affinis 
 Coridius alternatus 
 Coridius assamensis 
 Coridius brunneus 
 Coridius castaneus 
 Coridius chinensis 
 Coridius cuprifer 
 Coridius cuprinus 
 Coridius deckerti 
 Coridius dimorphus 
 Coridius divergens 
 Coridius dubitabilis 
 Coridius duraiae 
 Coridius farleyi 
 Coridius flavomarginatus 
 Coridius fuscus 
 Coridius janus 
 Coridius kerzhneri 
 Coridius laosanus 
 Coridius lenoiri 
 Coridius lividus 
 Coridius marginatus 
 Coridius neobrunneus 
 Coridius nepalensis 
 Coridius nubilis 
 Coridius nubilus 
 Coridius patruelis 
 Coridius prolixus 
 Coridius pseudaffinis 
 Coridius pseudoflavomarginatus 
 Coridius putoni 
 Coridius reflexus 
 Coridius remipes 
 Coridius rufomarginatus 
 Coridius sanguinolentus 
 Coridius singhalanus 
 Coridius turbatensis 
 Coridius viduatus 
 Coridius xanthopterus

References 

Heteroptera genera
Dinidoridae